FC TSK Simferopol is a professional football team based in Simferopol, Crimea, that was created in place of Ukrainian SC Tavriya Simferopol, following 2014 Russian annexation of Crimea.

TSK in the name stands for "Таврия Симферополь Крым" (Tavria – Simferopol – Crimea).

History
Ukrainian Premier League club SC Tavriya Simferopol was liquidated and a new team was organized instead, registered according to the laws of Russia. It then was licensed to participate in the third-tier Russian Professional Football League in the 2014–15 season. As Ukraine considers Crimea Ukrainian territory, the Football Federation of Ukraine lodged a complaint with UEFA about Crimean clubs' participation in Russian competitions. On 22 August 2014, UEFA decided "that any football matches played by Crimean clubs organised under the auspices of the Russian Football Union will not be recognised by UEFA until further notice".

On 4 December 2014, UEFA banned Crimean clubs from participating in Russian professional competitions, and announced that a new local Crimean League will be set up in the future that UEFA will manage directly.

The club won the first-ever Crimean Premier League in 2015–2016.

Ahead of the 2022/2023 season the club has announced its intention to compete in the Russian Football National League 2.

2019 squad

Honours

Crimean Premier League (1st Tier)
  2015–16
  2018–19
  2017–18

Coaches
 2014 Vladimir Martynov
 2014-2016 Serhiy Vasylyovych Shevchenko
 2016-2017 Serhiy Yakovych Shevchenko
 2017 Roman Voinarovsky
 2017 Maksym Startsev

League and cup history

Russia

Crimea

References

External links
  Official website

 
Football clubs in Simferopol
Association football clubs established in 2014
2014 establishments in Russia